The Concert for Violin, Piano and String Quartet, Op.21 is a piano sextet by Ernest Chausson scored for piano, violin and string quartet. The work was composed between 1888 and 1891.

Structure 
There are four movements:
Décidé – Animé
Sicilienne: Pas vite
Grave
Très animé.

Première performance 
The work was first performed in Brussels on 26 February 1892, with Eugène Ysaÿe taking the solo violin part. The work was well received. Chausson wrote in his diary:

External links 
 
 Manuscript at The Morgan Library

References

1891 compositions
Compositions by Ernest Chausson
Compositions for piano sextet
Compositions in D major